Jacek Banasiak FAAS (born 15 March 1959) is a Polish mathematician who is a Professor and DST/NRF SARChI Chair in Mathematical Models and Methods in Biosciences and Bioengineering at the University of Pretoria, South Africa.

Early life and education 
Jacek Banasiak was born on 15 March 1959 in Łódź, Poland. He obtained a Master of Science (MSc) in Math from the Łódź University of Technology in 1981, and Doctor of Philosophy (PhD) in mathematics on 15 March 1989 from the University of Strathclyde, Scotland. He was hablitated (PD) in Physics on 17 June 1999 from the Faculty of Mathematics, Informatics and Mechanics, University of Warsaw with a thesis titled Singularly Perturbed Evolution Equations with Applications in Kinetic Theory and Other Branches of Mathematical Physics.

Career and research 
Banasiak became a professor on 21 December 2007, and has been a Professor of Mathematical Sciences at the University of KwaZulu-Natal from 2011 until 2015. After, he joined the University of Pretoria and became the South African Research Chairs Initiative (SARChI) Chair in Mathematical Models and Methods in Biosciences and Bioengineering at the Department of Mathematics and Applied Mathematics, extraordinary professor at the Łódź University of Technology, and a visiting professor of Mathematics and Statistics at the Strathclyde University.

Banasiak research focuses on applied mathematics especially semigroup theory, asymptotic analysis, mathematical biology, fragmentations coagulation equations, and difference and differential equations.
 
Banasiak served as the vice president of the South African Mathematical Society (2001–2005). He is a member of the Academy of Science of South Africa and the African Institute for Mathematical Sciences (AIMS). He is also the Editor-in-Chief of Afrika Matematika since 2010, Associate Editor of Quaestiones Mathematicae and Evolution Equations an Control Theory (EECT), and a member of the Editorial Board of Mathematical Methods for the Applied Sciences and Differential Equations and Dynamical Systems.

Awards and honours 
In 2012, Banasiak won the South African Mathematical Society (SAMS) award for Research Distinction. In 2014, he was honoured with the Polish Cross of Merit (Silver) for his contributions to science. Banasiak was elected a Fellow of the African Academy of Sciences in 2016.

Selected publications

References

External links 
 
 Explicit solutions of fragmentation models with growth or decay, Professor Jacek Banasiak on YouTube

South African mathematicians
Polish mathematicians
Fellows of the African Academy of Sciences
Cross of Merit (Poland)
Łódź University of Technology alumni
Alumni of the University of Strathclyde
1959 births
Living people